is a train station in Makubetsu, Nakagawa District, Hokkaidō, Japan.

Lines
Hokkaido Railway Company
Nemuro Main Line Station K34

Adjacent stations

Railway stations in Hokkaido Prefecture
Railway stations in Japan opened in 1905
Makubetsu, Hokkaido